Pelican Point State Recreation Area is an undeveloped unit of the North Dakota state park system located on Lake Metigoshe,  northeast of Bottineau. The recreation area's  are only accessible on foot; there are no developed trails.

References

External links
Pelican Point State Recreation Area North Dakota Parks and Recreation Department

State parks of North Dakota
Protected areas of Bottineau County, North Dakota